Sir Lawrence Joseph is an attorney and a politician from Grenada.

He has a degree from University of London, master of laws from University of London, barrister at law from Lincoln’s Inn, bachelor of sciences in economics from University of the West Indies. He first worked as an economist until start practising law in 1977.

Joseph served as President of the Senate from 1984 to 1988 and from March 2013 to December 2014. He was also appointed Speaker of the House of Representatives in 2003, and served from January 2004 to June 2008.

Joseph also served as the leader of government business, and minister of education and Labour. He was appointed acting Attorney General of Grenada in 2017.

References 

Living people
Presidents of the Senate of Grenada
Speakers of the House of Representatives of Grenada
Attorneys General of Grenada
Education ministers of Grenada
20th-century Grenadian lawyers
University of the West Indies alumni
Alumni of the University of London
Members of Lincoln's Inn
Year of birth missing (living people)